Timothé Rupil (born 12 June 2003) is a Luxembourgian footballer who plays as a midfielder for Mainz 05 and the Luxembourg national team.

Career
Rupil made his international debut for Luxembourg on 7 October 2020 in a friendly match against Liechtenstein, which finished as a 1–2 home loss.

Career statistics

International

References

External links
 
 
 
 Timothé Rupil career overview

2003 births
Living people
Luxembourgian footballers
Luxembourg youth international footballers
Luxembourg under-21 international footballers
Luxembourg international footballers
Luxembourgian expatriate footballers
Luxembourgian expatriate sportspeople in Germany
Expatriate footballers in Germany
Association football midfielders
1. FSV Mainz 05 players